Aryad is one of the panchayaths in Alappuzha district in the Kerala state of southern India. It is divided into two parts: Aryad North and Aryad South. Aryad South is nearer to the municipal area. Subrahmanyapuram is the southern boundary and Komalapuram is the northern boundary of Aryad Panchayath. Komalapuram is in Aryad North.

An ancient mosque called the South Aryad Juma Masjid is situated there.

References 

Villages in Alappuzha district